Sabir may refer to:

People

Peoples and language
Sabir people, 5th–7th century nomadic people who lived in the north of the Caucasus
Sabir language, or Mediterranean Lingua Franca, a pidgin language

People with the name
Salimallah Sabir (born 1988), Kurdish peace activist
Adib Sabir, 12th-century royal poet of Persia
Agha Sabir (born 1981), Pakistani cricketer
Arman Sabir (fl. from 1993), Pakistani investigative journalist
Ayub Sabir (born 1940), Pakistani writer
Irfan Sabir (born 1977), Canadian lawyer and politician 
Kenny Sabir (born c. 1975), Australian musician
Mirza Alakbar Sabir (1862–1911), Azerbaijani satirical poet and teacher
Mohammad Sabir (disambiguation), several people)
Mohammed Sabir (fl. 2006), British businessman
Naeem Sabir (died 2011), Pakistani human rights activist
Nazir Sabir (fl. from 1974), Pakistani mountaineer
Rafiq Sabir (born 1950), Kurdish poet
Rafiq Abdus Sabir (fl. 2005), American doctor convicted of supporting terrorism
Rashid Sabir (1945–2012), Pakistani film, TV, radio and stage artist
Rizwaan Sabir, one of the Nottingham Two
Sahib Shah Sabir (1956–2007), poet of the Pashto language
Sharif Sabir (1928–2015), a Pakistani-Punjabi scholar and poet

Places
Jabal Sabir, a mountain in Yemen
Sabir, Azerbaijan (disambiguation), the name of several places

See also